Aleksandr Trifonov is a Soviet sprint canoer who competed in the early 1960s. He won a bronze medal in the K-4 1000 m event at the 1963 ICF Canoe Sprint World Championships in Jajce.

References

Living people
Soviet male canoeists
Year of birth missing (living people)
Russian male canoeists
ICF Canoe Sprint World Championships medalists in kayak